Basantpur is a Community development block and a town in district of Siwan, in Bihar state of India. It is one out of 6 blocks of Maharajganj Subdivision. The headquarter of the block is situated at Maharajganj Nagar Panchayat.

The block is divided into many Gram Panchayats and villages.

Gram Panchayats
Gram panchayats of Basantpur block in Maharajganj Subdivision, Siwan district.

Baiju barhoga
Basant pur
Basaon
Kanhauli
Kumkumpur
Molanapur
Rajapur
Sareya Srikant
Suryapura

See also
Maharajganj Subdivision
Administration in Bihar

References

Community development blocks in Siwan district